Jean-David Beauguel (born 21 March 1992) is a French professional footballer who plays as a striker for Saudi Professional League club Al-Wehda. After starting his football career in his native France, he spent a season playing club football in the Netherlands before moving to the Czech Republic, where he has played since 2014.

Career

Early career
Beauguel played for Toulouse in France. Although he didn't play in any league matches, he scored in a Coupe de la Ligue match against Nice on 31 August 2011. He later headed to the Netherlands, where he played for RKC Waalwijk, but left after the club was relegated from the Eredivisie at the end of the 2013–14 season.

Czech Republic
Beauguel trialled with Czech club Dukla Prague in July 2014, scoring four goals in a half-hour section of a friendly match in a pre-season friendly versus Varnsdorf. A week later he signed a three-year contract with Dukla. Beauguel scored seven goals in the first half of the 2014–15 Czech First League. Having scored nine goals in 61 games for Dukla over the course of two and a half seasons, Beauguel signed for First League side Fastav Zlín in January 2017.

In November 2018, with his Zlín contract due to expire in less than two months, he signed a pre-contract agreement with Viktoria Plzeň. On 8 December, he did not appear for Zlín in their Czech First League match against Plzeň, having asked Zlín coach Michal Bílek not to select him for the match. This stirred controversy in the media, with news outlet iSport reporting that Viktoria Plzeň allegedly pressured the player to skip the match. Zlín lost the match 2–0.

On 17 June 2022, Beauguel joined Saudi Arabian club Al-Wehda.

Career statistics

Honours
Individual
Czech First League Player of the Month: May 2022
Czech First League Top Goalscorer: 2021–22
Czech First League Forward of the Year: 2021–22

References

External links
 
 
 Voetbal International profile 

1992 births
Living people
Black French sportspeople
French footballers
Footballers from Strasbourg
Association football forwards
Eredivisie players
Czech First League players
Saudi Professional League players
Espérance Sportive de Tunis players
RKC Waalwijk players
FK Dukla Prague players
FC Fastav Zlín players
FC Viktoria Plzeň players
Al-Wehda Club (Mecca) players
French expatriate footballers
French expatriate sportspeople in the Netherlands
Expatriate footballers in the Netherlands
French expatriate sportspeople in the Czech Republic
Expatriate footballers in the Czech Republic
French expatriate sportspeople in Saudi Arabia
Expatriate footballers in Saudi Arabia